Eugene Bourdon may refer to:

 Eugène Bourdon (1808–1884), French watchmaker, inventor of the Bourdon tube pressure gauge 
 Eugene Bourdon (architect) (1870–1916), French architect